At the end of this season Ystalyfera were promoted back to the level of Division Three after an absence of three years. This was the first taste of success for ten years since the Division Five Championship in season 1998–99, the highest points total and number of league wins since then. The 264 total of most away game points was also equalled.

At the start of the season initial form of the side continued on from the end of the previous campaign, with commanding wins at home up to November, the only defeats being away - a surprising 2nd half collapse at Pontycymmer and the ‘theft’ of a victory at Bryncoch where we more than matched the eventual Division champions.
The relatively young ‘Fera side continued to grow in confidence boosted by the experience of no less than 7 former captains namely; Martyn Stoneman, Alun Guerrier, Steven Munkley, Kevin Williams, Peter Abraham, Damian James and Craig Lloyd, all contributing in their own individual ways and the latter two coaching the team in its success.
Cornerstone of the achievement was undoubtedly the two young props Kieran Lloyd and Daniel White. Hard working and dedicated they played in every game and won commendable plaudits from both local and visiting onlookers. Captain for his second year Paul Davies, led his side through a surge of five consecutive wins in April whilst getting married and enjoying a honeymoon as well! Gareth James, back in the side from the Bryncoch away game with 5 conversions, finished with the highest season total of 172 points, his career total to date being 535. Brother Damian increased his club record total to 1354 points. Graham Jones was top try scorer with 9 touchdowns.
Players Player was Stephan Jones and Supporters Player Daniel White.

A profitable season also delivered in the Welsh Cup where Ystalyfera equalled their highest progress reaching the Third Round for the seventh time.
Opportunity to achieve success in the elusive Swansea Valley cup proved disappointing with the termination of the event due to the failure of participating teams to complete the fixtures.
This season finished with great promise from an averagely young side, playing a fast positive style of play and much fun to watch.

National league division 4 south west

Ystalyfera 2008/09 Season Results

Ystalyfera 2008/09 Season Player Stats

References

Sport in Neath Port Talbot